John Andrews Walton (born 21 March 1928 – 17 July 1979) was an English footballer. His regular position was as a forward. He was born in Horwich, Lancashire.

Walton began his career as an amateur and represented England at amateur level. He enjoyed two spells with Bury and also spent time at Manchester United, Burnley, Coventry City, Chester and non-league side Kettering Town.

He is sometimes referred to as Johnny Walton.

External links
MUFCInfo.com profile

Bibliography

References

1928 births
1979 deaths
English footballers
Manchester United F.C. players
Bury F.C. players
Burnley F.C. players
Coventry City F.C. players
Kettering Town F.C. players
Chester City F.C. players
English Football League players
Association football forwards
People from Horwich